Wakefield is an English surname. Wakefield is the 1,356th most common surname in Great Britain, with 7,767 bearers. It is most common in the West Midlands, where it is the 257th most common surname, with 3,260 bearers. Other concentrations include, the City of Leeds, (237th,1,668), Devon, (457th,1,684), and Kent, (810th,1,614). Notable people with the surname include:

Andrew Wakefield (born 1957), former British bowel surgeon known for fraudulent research
Angela Wakefield (born 1978), British artist
Captain Arthur Wakefield (1799–1843), who died in the Wairau Affray in New Zealand 
Charity Wakefield (born 1980), English actress
Charles Wakefield, 1st Viscount Wakefield of Hythe (1859–1941), British peer and founder of Castrol
Charles Wakefield (numismatist) (1834–1919), British numismatist and museum curator
Daniel Wakefield (1776–1846), writer on political economy
Daniel Bell Wakefield (1798–1858), son of Edward Wakefield
Edward Wakefield (1774–1854), English philanthropist and statistician
Edward Wakefield (New Zealand politician) (1845–1924), son of Felix Wakefield, New Zealand politician and journalist
Edward Gibbon Wakefield (1796–1862), influential theorist on colonization
Edward Wakefield (British politician) (1903–1969), British civil servant and Conservative Member of Parliament
Elsie Maud Wakefield (1886–1972), English mycologist
Emma Wakefield-Paillet (born 1868), American physician
Felix Wakefield (1807–1875), brother of Edward Gibbon Wakefield
George William Wakefield (1887–1942), British comics author
Gilbert Wakefield (1756–1801), English scholar and controversialist
Howard Wakefield (1884–1941), American baseball player
Hugh Wakefield (1888–1971), English actor
Humphry Wakefield (born 1936), English baronet
James Wakefield (1825–1910), United States politician
Jenn Wakefield (born 1989), Canadian ice hockey player
Jerningham Wakefield (1820–1879), son of Edward Gibbon Wakefield, New Zealand politician and author of Adventures in New Zealand
John Allen Wakefield (1797–1873), United States politician and military leader
John Peter Wakefield (1915–1942), British racing car driver
Mary Augusta Wakefield (1853-1910), British author, composer, and singer
Melanie Wakefield, Australian psychologist and behavioural researcher
Norman Arthur Wakefield (1918–1972), Australian naturalist
Priscilla Wakefield (1751–1832), author
Rhys Wakefield, (born 1988), Australian actor
Richard Wakefield, American poet and literary critic
Robert Wakefield (died 1537), English linguist and scholar
H. Russell Wakefield, (1888–1964), English author
Peter Wakefield (disambiguation)
S. A. Wakefield (1927–2009), Australian author
Susan Wakefield, taxation expert from New Zealand
Tim Wakefield (born 1966), pitcher for the Boston Red Sox
Vikki Wakefield (born 1970), Australian young adult fiction writer
Wavell Wakefield, 1st Baron Wakefield of Kendal (1898–1983), British politician
Colonel William Wakefield (1801–1848), who founded Wellington, New Zealand, brother of Edward Gibbon Wakefield

In fiction 
 Elizabeth Wakefield and Jessica Wakefield twins from Sweet Valley High.

English-language surnames
English toponymic surnames